Robert Campbell Niven (11 December 1859 – 14 April 1919) was a New Zealand cricketer. He played first-class cricket for Otago and Wellington between 1888 and 1901.

He was regarded as one of New Zealand's best wicket-keepers of his time. He kept wicket for New Zealand in the three-day match against the Australians in 1896–97, when New Zealand fielded a side of 15. It was New Zealand's first international match.

He worked as chief clerk in the Government Insurance Department in Wellington. After contracting influenza during the 1918 flu pandemic he developed severe depression. His body was found in Wellington boat harbour on 14 April 1919. The subsequent inquiry found that he had drowned, but made no finding as to whether his death was the result of accident or suicide. He left a widow but no family.

See also
 List of Otago representative cricketers

References

External links
 

1859 births
1919 deaths
New Zealand cricketers
Otago cricketers
Wellington cricketers
Cricketers from Melbourne
Deaths by drowning in New Zealand
Wicket-keepers